Liada was a town of ancient Bithynia, on the road from Nicomedia to Nicaea.

Its site is located near Sarıağıl, in Asiatic Turkey.

References

Populated places in Bithynia
Former populated places in Turkey
History of Bursa Province
İznik District